Wednesday was a pop vocal group from Oshawa, Ontario, Canada. They scored a hit single on the U.S. Billboard Hot 100 in 1974 with their cover of the song "Last Kiss", which peaked at #34. That same year, they were nominated for the Canadian Juno Award for Most Promising Group. The single reached #2 in Canada and #1 on the Canadian Billboard 100. A follow-up single, a remake of "Teen Angel", was their final chart single in America.  The parent album, entitled Last Kiss, was released on Ampex Records in Canada, Sussex Records in the U.S., and A&M Records throughout the rest of the world.

The group continued with success in Canada, before and after changing their name to Wenzday in 1976. They scored their second biggest hit with an Elton John cover, "Loving You Baby".  It reached #6 in Canada.

The band reunited briefly in 2003 and 2017 for a few successful concerts. Paul Andrew Smith went on to record several solo albums - A Stranger in My Own World, Above the Stars, AGO, Masks and Mummeries, Time, The Power of Schnoz on Moondog Records under Black Violet Project.

September 2022 Wednesday was inducted into the OMA Hall of fame with a lifetime achievement award presented to them at the event by their long-time producer John Driscoll.

On December 20, 2022, drummer Randy Begg died of a heart attack at his home.

Members
Mike O'Neil - guitar, banjo, vocals
Paul Andrew Smith - guitar, keyboards, vocals
John (Jose) Dufek - bass, harmonica
Randy Begg - drums, vocals (died 2022)
Jeremy Thornton - keyboards, vocals

Discography

Albums
1974 - Last Kiss - Ampex AC-10152
Side 1: "Last Kiss" - "Teen Angel" - "Roses Are Red" - "Tell Laura I Love Her" - "Gloria" Side 2: "What's on My Mind" - "Ride" - "Taking Me Home" - "Don't Let Me Wait Too Long" - "Good Time Girl"
1976 - Loving You Baby - Skyline SKY 10160
Side 1: "Thinking of You" - "Doin' the Best That I Can" - "Loving You Baby" - "Fly Away" - "Send a Little Love" Side 2: "Could You Refuse Her" - "Don't Let It Get You Down" - "Here Today Gone Tomorrow" - "Melody Moon" - "I'm Coming Home" - "The Show Will Never End"
1977 - Nearly Made It (as Wenzday) - Skyline SKY 10164-V
Side 1: "Ride Me" - "Now You're a Lady" - "Fancy Pants" - "Through Your Head" - "Ruby Baby" Side 2: "Dream Queen" - "I Was Built for Comfort" - "Honey" - "I Nearly Made It"
2003 - "The Singles" - Moondog Records EMC 0403 
 "Hang On Girl" - "Last Kiss" - Teen Angel" - "Roses Are Red" - "Fly Away" - "She's a Woman" - "Here Today Gone Tomorrow" - "Loving You Baby" - "Doin' The Best That I Can" - "Ruby Baby" - "Fancy Pants" - " Ride Me" - "Now Your a Lady" - "Sheila" - "Eleanor"
2003 - "Limited Edition" Moondog Records EMC 0402
 "Last Kiss" - "Here Today Gone Tomorrow" - "Doin' the Best That I Can" - "Fly Away" - "Loving You Baby" - "Ride Me" - "Now Your a Lady" - "Dream Queen" - "I'm Comin' Home" - "Sheila" - "Eleanor"
2004 - "The Singles" - A collection of single releases including all charted material.
2017 - "Afterlight" - A best of compilation

Singles
1971 - "Hang On Girl" / "Velvet Colours" - Ampex AC-1304
1973 - "Last Kiss" / "Without You" - Ampex AC-1325 [CAN #2, US #34, AUS #68]
1974 - "Teen Angel" / "Taking Me Home" - Ampex AC-1355 [CAN #15, US #79]
1974 - "Roses Are Red" / "Ride" - Ampex AC-1362 [CAN #43]
1974 - "Fly Away" / "Good Time Girl" - Ampex AC-1365 [CAN #21]
1975 - "She's a Woman" / "Good Time Girl" - Ampex AC-1370
1975 - "Here Today Gone Tomorrow" / "What's on My Mind" - Skyline SKY 001X [CAN #49]
1975 - "Loving You Baby" / "Don't Let Me Wait Too Long" - Skyline SKY 003X [CAN #6]
1976 - "Doing the Best That I Can" / "Could You Refuse Her" - Skyline SKY 006X [CAN #52]
as Wenzday:
1976 - "Ruby Baby" / "Melody Moon" - Skyline SKY 011X [CAN #36]
1977 - "Fancy Pants" / "Through Your Head" - Skyline SKY 012X
1977 - "Ride Me" / "Nearly Made It" - Skyline SKY 014X [CAN #47]
1977 - "Now You're a Lady" / "Dream Queen" - Skyline SKY 016X
1981 - "Eleanor" / "Sheila"

References

1971 establishments in Ontario
1981 disestablishments in Ontario
Canadian pop music groups
Musical groups established in 1971
Musical groups disestablished in 1981
Musical groups from Oshawa
Cover bands
Celebration (record label) artists